The 1989 GTE U.S. Men's Hard Court Championships was a men's tennis tournament played on outdoor hard courts at the Indianapolis Tennis Center in Indianapolis, Indiana in the United States that was part of the 1989 Nabisco Grand Prix. It was the second edition of the tournament and was held from August 7 through August 13, 1989. Second-seeded John McEnroe won the singles title.

Finals

Singles

 John McEnroe defeated  Jay Berger 6–4, 4–6, 6–4
 It was McEnroe's 3rd singles title of the year and the 75th of his career.

Doubles

 Pieter Aldrich /  Danie Visser defeated  Peter Doohan /  Laurie Warder 7–6, 7–6
 It was Aldrich's 1st title of the year and the 2nd of his career. It was Visser's 1st title of the year and the 4th of his career.

References

External links
 Official website
 ITF tournament edition details

GTE U.S. Men's Hard Court Championships
Atlanta Open (tennis)
Tennis tournaments in Indiana
GTE U.S. Men's Hard Court Championships
GTE U.S. Men's Hard Court Championships
GTE U.S. Men's Hard Court Championships